The Star Mountains (Dutch (colonial): Sterrengebergte; Indonesian: Pegunungan Bintang) are a mountain range in western Papua New Guinea and the eastern end of Highland Papua, Indonesia, stretching from the eastern end of Indonesia to the Hindenburg Range in Papua New Guinea.

The Indonesian Pegunungan Bintang Regency and Star Mountains Rural LLG in Papua New Guinea are named after the mountain range.

History
The earlier Western expedition to the mountains was led by Jan Sneep, a Dutch colonial civil servant who operated from the Sibil Valley. The expedition, which started in April 1959, mapped the terrain and collected anthropological data of the people who lived in the area. The expedition used two small Bell helicopters, but the altitudes severely limited their effectiveness and one of them crashed, forcing the expedition to rely more on traditional man power. Climbers from the expedition reached the peak of Puncak Mandala on 9 September 1959.

Climate
The Star Mountains have an annual rainfall of more than 10,000 mm/year, and although no official scientific weather station has ever been established it has been claimed to be one of the wettest places on earth.

Languages

In terms of the number of independent language families, the Star Mountains are one of the most linguistically diverse regions in New Guinea. These language families and isolates include:

Pauwasi
Eastern Pauwasi
Western Pauwasi (Tebi–Towei)
Kwomtari
Fas, Baibai
Guriaso
Kwomtari, Nai-Biaka
Pyu

Border
Kaure–Kosare
Kapauri
Lepki-Murkim
Senagi (Angor-Dera)
Tofanma-Namla

Elseng
Kembra
Kimki
Molof
Usku
Yetfa

References

External links 
 Photos from Star Mountains
 Dutch Star Mountains expedition

Mountain ranges of Western New Guinea
Mountain ranges of Papua New Guinea